Parapantonyssus ipiri is a species of beetle in the family Cerambycidae, the only species in the genus Parapantonyssus.

References

Elaphidiini